Archibald Stewart "Iron Man" Campbell (October 20, 1903 – December 22, 1989) was a Major League Baseball pitcher for the New York Yankees in the 1928 season. He also played with the Washington Senators in 1929 and the Cincinnati Reds in 1930. Campbell pitched in 40 games in parts of three seasons, chiefly as a reliever, with two wins, six losses and a 5.86 ERA. Campbell batted and threw right-handed.

He was born in Maplewood, New Jersey and died in Sparks, Nevada.

References

External links

Major League Baseball pitchers
Cincinnati Reds players
New York Yankees players
Washington Senators (1901–1960) players
San Diego Padres (minor league) players
Wichita Izzies players
Baseball players from New Jersey
1903 births
1989 deaths
St. Paul Saints (AA) players
Columbus Red Birds players
Indianapolis Indians players
Hollywood Stars players
Los Angeles Angels (minor league) players
People from Maplewood, New Jersey
Sportspeople from Essex County, New Jersey